Symphyotrichum ontarionis (formerly Aster ontarionis) is a species of flowering plant in the family Asteraceae native to eastern North America. Each flower head has many tiny florets put together into what appear as one.

Description
Symphyotrichym ontarionis forms colonies. The leaves are alternate and simple. The flowers, produced between July and October, have white ray florets and yellow centers composed of disk florets.

Stems
Usually, each plant has one stem arising from the rhizome, but there can be as many as three. They are straight and erect, with no hair mid-stem, becoming uniformly hairy farthest away from the base (distally). These hairs can be long and soft or coarse. Symphyotrichum ontarionis var. glabratum may have little to no hair (glabrous) on the distal stems.

Leaves
Characteristics vary among leaves on the same plant. They occur on the base, stems, and branches and become smaller the farther away from the base they grow. By the time flowers appear, the leaves at the base and on the stem have often withered or fallen.

The leaves are thin, have short hairs on the edges (margins), and come to a point. The backs usually have straight hairs all pointing in more or less the same direction, and the fronts of the leaves are generally the same, sometimes rough to the touch instead. On  glabratum, both faces are hairless or nearly so (glabrate).
 
Basal (bottom) leaves are spatulate to oblanceolate-obovate, and they wither by the time the plant flowers. Their bases narrow gradually (are attenuate). These leaves have a leafstalk (petiole) which may be clearly noticeable or very short, but the basal leaves are not sessile. The petioles have narrow wings, are fringed with hairs (ciliate) and wavy or saw-toothed, and are sheathed at the bottom.

Sizes become progressively smaller the farther they grow from the base. Stem leaves are usually withering by flowering. They are sessile or petiolate, and any petioles have narrow wings that may or may not clasp the stem. The shapes of the stem leaves vary from ovate or lance-ovate to elliptic-lanceolate or oblanceolate. Their margins are wavy or saw-toothed (sometimes coarsely), and their tips (apices) may be acute to acuminate, or short-caudate. Their bases are attenuate to cuneate. 

Distal leaves, higher on the stem and on the branches with the flower heads, are sessile. They are elliptic-lanceolate to oblanceolate or lanceolate in shape. Margins are entire (smooth on the edges with no teeth or lobes) or serrulate, apices are acute to acuminate, and bases are cuneate. The more distal, the smaller they are, and this size change occurs progressively.

Flowers
Ontario aster is a late-summer and fall blooming perennial. Ample, open flower heads grow in paniculiform arrays, sometimes secund (to one side) on the upper sides of the branches (known as peduncles). These branched clusters of flowers (known as inflorescences) may be ascending, at almost a right angle (divaricate), or in long arches.

At the base of each flower head are from one to five bracts which look like (and technically are) small leaves that grade into the phyllaries. They are linear-lanceolate and pilose.

Involucres and phyllaries
In the Asteraceae family, at the base of the head and surrounding the flowers before opening, is a bundle of sepal-like bracts or scales called phyllaries, which together form the involucre that protects the individual flowers in the head before they open.

The phyllaries are appressed or spreading. The shape of the outer phyllaries is linear-obovate, and the inner phyllary shape is oblong-lanceolate to linear. The margins of each phyllary are translucent, ciliate, and uneven. The phyllaries have green chlorophyllous zones that are lanceolate, with acute to acuminate and mucronulate tips. Outer phyllaries are sparsely pilose except on  glabratum, which are glabrous. Inner phyllaries are glabrous.

Florets
The  ray florets are usually white, rarely pinkish or light purple to blue.

The disk florets start out as cream or light yellow turning purple to brown when enlarged. Each has 5 lobes, and there are  florets within the disk. When the disk florets have opened, the lobes are spreading and lanceolate in shape.

Fruit
The fruits (seeds) of Symphyotrichum ontarionis are not true achenes. They are cypselae, resembling an achene but surrounded by a calyx sheath. They are gray or tan with an oblong obovoid shape and sometimes compressed.

Chromosomes

Taxonomy
Along with many other species, Symphyotrichum ontarionis was formerly included in the genus Aster. However, this broad circumscription of Aster is polyphyletic and the North American asters are classified in Symphyotrichum and several other genera. The genus Symphyotrichum is sometimes called American-asters. Symphyotrichum ontarionis was created (as Symphyotrichum ontarione) with American botanist Guy L. Nesom's evaluation of Aster sensu lato in 1995.

The basionym of Symphyotrichum ontarionis is Aster ontarionis , and it has several taxonomic synonyms. Its name with author citations is Symphyotrichum ontarionis . American botanist Karl McKay Wiegand, in 1928, formally described what we know today as Symphyotrichum ontarionis. Wiegand, written , is the standard botanical author abbreviation for Karl McKay Wiegand. Likewise,  is the abbreviation for Guy L. Nesom. Wiegand's abbreviation is placed in parentheses because his authorship was retained when Nesom cited Aster ontarionis  as the basionym at the time he renamed the species.

Symphyotrichum ontarionis is classified in the subgenus Symphyotrichum, section Symphyotrichum, subsection Dumosi. It is one of the "bushy asters and relatives". The species name ontarionis is a Latinization of Ontario for Lake Ontario, as Wiegand stated in his description that the species was "apparently limited to the upper St. Lawrence Valley not far from Lake Ontario."

Two varieties of Symphyotrichum ontarionis are recognized:
  ontarionis, the autonym, has leaves hairy underneath. As the autonym variety, it was automatically created when the first variety was defined.
  glabratum , the glabrate variety, has leaves hairless or nearly so underneath.

Distribution and habitat
Symphyotrichum ontarionis occurs from Ontario and Quebec south to North Carolina and Texas.  ontarionis is found throughout most of this range, and is replaced by  glabratum in northern Ontario, Quebec, and Michigan. The species is typically found in shaded, moist soils that occur in moist forests and along stream banks.

Conservation
NatureServe lists it as Secure (G5) worldwide; Imperiled (S2) in Kansas, Vermont, and West Virginia; and, Vulnerable (S3) in Georgia.

Notes

References

External links

GoBotany – Symphyotrichum ontarionis
Ladybird Johnson Wildflower Center, wildflower.org – Symphyotrichum ontarionis
Minnesota Wildflowers – Ontario Aster
Ontario Wildflowers – Ontario Aster
Symphyotrichum ontarionis var. ontarionis (Wiegand) G.L.Nesom – Online Virtual Flora of Wisconsin

ontarionis
Flora of Canada
Flora of the United States
Plants described in 1928
Taxa named by Karl McKay Wiegand